FC Dynamo Voronezh is a Russian football team from Voronezh. It played professionally in 1946, 1949 and 2006–2008. In 1949, they played in the second-highest Soviet First League, taking 8th place in Zone 1. As of 2009, it plays in the Amateur Football League.

Team name history
 1925–2007: FC Dynamo Voronezh
 2008: FC Dynamo-Voronezh Voronezh
 2009–present: FC Dynamo Voronezh

External links
  Team history at KLISF

Association football clubs established in 1925
Football clubs in Russia
Sport in Voronezh
1925 establishments in Russia